Yadboro River, a perennial river of the Clyde River catchment, is located in the Southern Tablelands and the upper ranges of the South Coast regions of New South Wales, Australia.

Course and features
Yadboro River rises below Currockbilly Mountain on the eastern slopes of the Budawang Range within Budawang National Park, east northeast of Braidwood, and flows generally northerly parallel to the range, then east, joined by one minor tributary before reaching its confluence with the Clyde River at Campus Head, near Yadboro Flat. The river descends  over its  course.

See also

 Rivers of New South Wales
 List of rivers of New South Wales (L–Z)
 List of rivers of Australia

References

External links
 

 

Rivers of New South Wales
South Coast (New South Wales)
Southern Tablelands
City of Shoalhaven